The second season of Black-ish aired from September 23, 2015 to May 18, 2016, on ABC in the United States. It is produced by Khalabo Ink Society, Cinema Gypsy Productions, Principato-Young Entertainment and ABC Studios, with creator Kenya Barris, who also served as executive producer alongside Anthony Anderson, Brian Dobbins, Jonathon Groff and Helen Sugland.

The series revolves around Dre, portrayed by Anthony Anderson, a family man who struggles with finding his cultural identity while raising his kids in a white neighborhood. He lives with his wife, Bow (Tracee Ellis Ross).

On March 3, 2016, ABC renewed the series for a third season.


Cast

Main cast
 Anthony Anderson as Dre Johnson
 Tracee Ellis Ross as Bow Johnson
 Yara Shahidi as Zoey Johnson
 Marcus Scribner as Andre ("Junior") Johnson Jr.
 Miles Brown as Jack Johnson
 Marsai Martin as Diane Johnson
 Jeff Meacham as Josh Oppenhol
 Jenifer Lewis as Ruby Johnson

Recurring cast
 Laurence Fishburne as Earl "Pops" Johnson
 Peter Mackenzie as Leslie Stevens
 Deon Cole as Charlie Telphy
 Allen Maldonado as Curtis
 Nicole Sullivan as Janine
 Catherine Reitman as Lucy
 Wanda Sykes as Daphne Lido

Guest cast
 Kent Faulcon as Principal Green
 Andrew Daly as Dr. Evan Windsor
 Zendaya as Resheida
 Marc Evan Jackson as David Cooper
 Beth Lacke as Andrea Cooper
 Michael Strahan as June Bug
 Amber Rose as Dominique
 Barry Shabaka Henley as T Jackson
 Keraun Harris as Smoke
 Faizon Love as Sha
 Tyra Banks as Gigi
 Mindy Sterling as Pam
 LaMonica Garrett as Davis
 John Witherspoon as James Brown
 Anna Deavere Smith as Alicia
 Toby Huss as Nelson
 Brittany Daniel as Blair
 Don Lemon as himself
 Bumper Robinson as Marcus Montgomery
 Sayeed Shahidi as Adonis Culpepper
 Regina Hall as Vivian
 Raven-Symoné as Rhonda Johnson
 Phil Morris as Frank Duckworth
 Valarie Pettiford as Donna Duckworth
 Nat Faxon as Joseph Everton

Episodes

Reception

Ratings

Accolades

References

2015 American television seasons
2016 American television seasons
Black-ish